The 2022 Women's FIH Hockey Junior World Cup is the ninth edition of the Women's FIH Hockey Junior World Cup, the biennial women's under-21 field hockey world championship organized by the International Hockey Federation.

It was scheduled to be held from 5 to 16 December 2021 in Potchefstroom, South Africa. Because of a new COVID-19 variant, the tournament was put on hold on 26 November 2021 and later postponed, with the option to be hosted by South Africa. On 10 January 2022 it was announced the tournament will take place from 2 to 13 April 2022 at the original venue. In February the tournament was moved one day forward to start on 1 and end on 12 April 2022.

Argentina were the defending champions. They were defeated 4–1 in the quarter-finals by Germany. The Netherlands won a record fourth title by defeating Germany 3–1 in the final.So sad thing about this tournament is India have more wins and points than silver and btonze medalists nations.

Qualification
A total of 16 teams qualified for the final tournament. In addition to South Africa, who qualified automatically as hosts, 15 other teams qualified from five separate continental competitions.

Squads

Umpires
The following 14 umpires were selected on 30 March by the FIH:

Maria Locatelli (ARG)
Céline Martin-Schmets (BEL)
Catalina Montesino (CHI)
Ivona Makar (CRO)
Rebecca Woodcock (ENG)
Inès El Hajem (FRA)
Sophie Bockelmann (GER)
Alison Keogh (IRL)
Ilaria Amorosini (ITA)
Lisette Baljon (NED)
Victoria Pazos (PAR)
Wanri Venter (RSA)
Kim Yoon-seon (KOR)
Gema Calderón (ESP)

Preliminary round
All times are local (UTC+2).

Pool A

Pool B

Pool C

Pool D

Classification round

Bracket

Placement finals

Thirteenth to fifteenth place classification

Cross-overs

Thirteenth and fourteenth place

Ninth to twelfth place classification

Cross-overs

Eleventh and twelfth place

Ninth and tenth place

Medal round

Bracket

Quarter-finals

Fifth to eighth place classification

Cross-overs

Seventh and eighth place

Fifth and sixth place

First to fourth place classification

Semi-finals

Third and fourth place

Final

Awards
The following awards were given at the conclusion of the tournament.

Final standings

Goalscorers

See also
2021 Men's FIH Hockey Junior World Cup
2022 Women's FIH Hockey World Cup

References

External links
FIH website

 
Women's Hockey Junior World Cup
Junior World Cup
International women's field hockey competitions hosted by South Africa
FIH Hockey Junior World Cup
Potchefstroom
Sport in North West (South African province)
FIH Hockey World Cup
FIH Hockey Junior World Cup
Junior World Cup
Sports events affected by the 2022 Russian invasion of Ukraine